Fort Road Food Street (Sarak-e-Khorak - Roshnai Darwaza) is a food street located between Fort Road and Roshnai Gate of the Walled City in Lahore, Punjab, Pakistan. The street was reconstructed and opened in 2012 as a tourist attraction, by offering Lahori cuisine and views of Badshahi Mosque. The street was inaugurated on 21 January 2012, by Hamza Shahbaz Sharif to replace Gawalmandi Food Street. In 2013, the Walled City Lahore Authority (WCLA) took charge of the food street from the district government and gave it a major face-lift in collaboration with the private sector.

The Fort Road Food Street is known for traditional Lahori cuisines with a view of the Mughal era Badshahi Mosque. The building itself that the street is based on was built during the era of the Mughal Empire and the British Rule.

See also 
 Gawalmandi Food Street
 List of restaurant districts and streets

References

External links

Streets in Lahore
Lahore
Lahori cuisine
Tourist attractions in Lahore
Walled City of Lahore
Restaurant districts and streets in Pakistan
Street food in Pakistan
2012 establishments in Pakistan
Restaurants in Lahore